"Hearts Burst into Fire" is a song by the heavy metal band Bullet for My Valentine. The song was released as the second single from their second album, Scream Aim Fire.
The song is featured in the video game NHL 09. Like most of their songs, the song is played in Drop C guitar tuning.

Music video
The video of the song is a montage of clips from the tour accompanying the album. It features fans displaying support for the band, many of whom display logos and tattoos featuring song names and lyrics by the band.

Track listing
2 Track Single
 "Hearts Burst into Fire" - 4:57
 "Hearts Burst into Fire (Acoustic)" - 3:58

7" Single
 "Hearts Burst into Fire" - 4:57
 "No Easy Way Out" - 4:32

Promotional Single
 "Hearts Burst into Fire (Radio Edit)" - 4:15
 "Hearts Burst into Fire (Clean Album Version)" - 4:58
 "Hearts Burst into Fire (UK Edit)" - 3:39

Personnel
Matthew "Matt" Tuck - lead vocals, rhythm guitar, intro guitar solo
Michael "Padge" Paget - lead guitar, backing vocals
Michael "Moose" Thomas - drums
Jason "Jay" James - bass guitar, backing vocals

Charts

References

External links
 

Bullet for My Valentine songs
Heavy metal ballads
2008 songs
2008 singles
Songs written by Matthew Tuck
Songs written by Michael Paget
Songs written by Jason James (musician)
Sony BMG singles